Nucleoside-specific porin (the tsx gene of Escherichia coli) is an outer membrane protein, Tsx, which constitutes the receptor for colicin K and Bacteriophage T6, and functions as a substrate-specific channel for nucleosides and deoxy-nucleosides.<ref
 name="PUB00006257"></ref> The protein contains 294 amino acids, the first 22 of which are characteristic of a bacterial signal sequence peptide. Tsx shows no significant similarities to general bacterial porins.

References

Protein domains
Protein families
Outer membrane proteins